Torkildsen Island is a small island in Hinlopen Strait. It is part of the Rønnbeck Islands in the Svalbard archipelago. It lies east of Cape Weyprecht on Spitsbergen.

It is elongated and consists of four parts. At its east and west ends there are two small peninsulas. The central part of the island itself is divided into two parts by a narrow area, probably a sandbank like that at Kiepert Island in the nearby Bastian Islands.

The wildlife consists largely of polar bears.

The island was discovered in 1867 by the Swedish-Norwegian polar explorer Nils Fredrik Rønnbeck. The Rønnbeck Islands are named after Norwegian seal hunters, and this one is named after the sealing skipper T. Torkildsen.

References

Islands of Svalbard
Seal hunting